The 2016 Revolution Technologies Pro Tennis Classic was a professional tennis tournament played on outdoor clay courts. It was the eleventh edition of the tournament and part of the 2016 ITF Women's Circuit, offering a total of $75,000 in prize money. It took place in Indian Harbour Beach, Florida, United States, on 2–8 May 2016.

Singles main draw entrants

Seeds 

 1 Rankings as of 25 April 2016.

Other entrants 
The following players received wildcards into the singles main draw:
  Usue Maitane Arconada
  Sofia Kenin
  Raveena Kingsley
  Sanaz Marand

The following players received entry from the qualifying draw:
  Caroline Dolehide
  Ulrikke Eikeri
  Julia Jones
  Bernarda Pera

The following player received entry by a protected ranking:
  Melanie Oudin

The following player received entry by a special exempt:
  Taylor Townsend

Champions

Singles

 Jennifer Brady def.  Taylor Townsend, 6–3, 7–5

Doubles

 Julia Glushko /  Alexandra Panova def.  Jessica Pegula /  Maria Sanchez, 7–5, 6–4

External links 
 2016 Revolution Technologies Pro Tennis Classic at ITFtennis.com
 

2016 ITF Women's Circuit
Revolution
Tennis tournaments in the United States
2016 in sports in Florida